Ivan Pejčić (Serbian Cyrillic: Иван Пејчић; born 11 September 1982) is a Serbian footballer who plays as a striker. He took Macedonian citizenship in 2006 to be able to play for the Macedonian national football team. In 2008, he won the Macedonian Championship and the Macedonian Cup with FK Rabotnički.

On 10 July 2008 he signed for FC Aarau of the Swiss Super League.

Honours
Macedonian First Football League: 2007–08
Macedonian Football Cup: 2007–08
Best foreign player in Prva Liga: 2005 and 2006

External links
FC Aarau profile 

Swiss Football League profile

References
 

1982 births
Living people
Sportspeople from Niš
Serbian footballers
Association football forwards
FK Obilić players
FK Radnički Niš players
FK Radnički 1923 players
FK Rabotnički players
FC Aarau players
FK Jagodina players
Enosis Neon Paralimni FC players
Expatriate footballers in Switzerland
Expatriate footballers in Cyprus